Samia ricini, the Eri silkmoth, is a species of insect, a member of the family Saturniidae which includes the giant silk moths. This moth is a domestic polyhybrid that has been bred for centuries due to the silk it makes. The name is based on the host plant used for feeding the caterpillars, castor, Ricinus communis. This moth is derived from several different species within the genus including Samia cynthia and Samia canningi.

References

Saturniinae
Moths described in 1798